Zygaspis violacea is a worm lizard species in the family Amphisbaenidae. It is endemic to Mozambique.

References

Zygaspis
Reptiles of Mozambique
Endemic fauna of Mozambique
Reptiles described in 1854
Taxa named by Wilhelm Peters